(born  May 13, 1949 in Sukumo, Kōchi Prefecture, Japan) is a Japanese former professional baseball outfielder. He played with the Lotte Orions from 1972 to 1983 and the Hanshin Tigers from 1984 to 1987. He won the Japan Series Most Valuable Player Award in 1974.

External links
Baseball-Reference

1949 births
Living people
Japanese baseball players
Nippon Professional Baseball outfielders
Lotte Orions players
Hanshin Tigers players
Nippon Professional Baseball coaches